The 2022–23 Chinese Men's Volleyball Super League is the 27th season of the Chinese Men's Volleyball Super League, the highest professional volleyball league in China. The season began on 29 October 2022 and concluded on 5 January 2023.

The fourteen teams were divided into two groups. However, the Group A teams' matches, which were originally due to be held in Kaifeng, Henan Province from 29 October to 4 November, were postponed due to grave concerns of epidemic and rescheduled to 23–29 November instead. The matches of Group B in Wuyuan, Shangrao, Jiangxi Province pushed through.

Beijing BAIC Motor defended and crowned as back-to-back champions of the season after defeating Shanghai Bright in the best-of-three finals (2–0).

Club teams

Personnel

Transfer of players

Foreign players
The total number of foreign players per club has no restrictions.

Format
The League adopted a new format called "competition system" that is used throughout the season.

Stage I
 Divided into three sub-stages in a single round robin. The 14 teams are divided into two groups (A and B) in six pools using the serpentine system based on their previous rank from the 2020–21 season.
 First sub-stage: Pool A (GA1-7) and Pool B (GB1-7).
 Second sub-stage: Pool (GA1-4, GB5-7) and Pool D (GA5-7, GB1-4).
 Third sub-stage: Pool E (GA1-4, GB1-4) and Pool F (GA5-7, GB5-7).

Stage II
 Top 8 teams are divided into Pools G and H using the serpentine system.
 Teams in each groups played in a round-robin first then battle in the quarterfinals in a best-of-three series.
 Bottom 4 teams from each group will qualify for the 5th–8th places.
 Bottom 6 teams placed in Pool K to battle in a round robin to determine their final rankings.

Stage III
 The top 8 teams battle in a cross-over matches in a best-of-three series in quarterfinals.
 QF1: G1 v H4
 QF2: H1 v G4
 QF3: H2 v G3
 QF4: G2 v H3
 Winner teams from each brackets qualified for the semifinals.
 The top four teams will play in a best-of-three series in the semifinals. Winners will advance to championship match while losers will battle for 3rd place match.
 SF1: G1H4 winner v H2G3 winner
 SF2: H1G4 winner v G2H3 winner
 The bottom 4 teams will play in a best-of-three series in the 5th–8th classification. Winners advance to 5th place match while losers will battle for 7th place match.
 5–8C1: G1H4 loser v H2G3 loser
 5–8C2: H1G4 loser v G2H3 loser

Stage IV (final)
 Championship match, 3rd place match, 5th place match and 7th place match will be a best-of-three series.

Season standing procedure
The ranking of the round robin group matches are determined to the following criteria and order:

 Total number of victories (matches won, matches lost)
 In the event of a tie, the following first tiebreaker will apply: The teams will be ranked by the most points gained per match as follows:
 Match won 3–0 or 3–1: 3 points for the winner, 0 points for the loser
 Match won 3–2: 2 points for the winner, 1 point for the loser
 Match forfeited: 3 points for the winner, 0 points (0–25, 0–25, 0–25) for the loser
 If teams are still tied after examining the number of victories and points gained, then the CVL will examine the results in order to break the tie in the following order:
 Sets quotient: if two or more teams are tied on the number of points gained, they will be ranked by the quotient resulting from the division of the number of all sets won by the number of all sets lost.
 Points quotient: if the tie persists based on the sets quotient, the teams will be ranked by the quotient resulting from the division of all points scored by the total of points lost during all sets.
 If the tie persists based on the points quotient, the tie will be broken based on the team that won the match of the Round Robin Group Stage between the tied teams. When the tie in points quotient is between three or more teams, these teams ranked taking into consideration only the matches involving the teams in question.

Regular round
 All times are China Standard Time (UTC+8:00).

Stage I

Standings

Pool A
|-
!align=center colspan=12|Round 1
|-

|-
!align=center colspan=12|Round 2
|-

|-
!align=center colspan=12|Round 3
|-

|-
!align=center colspan=12|Round 4
|-

|-
!align=center colspan=12|Round 5
|-

|-
!align=center colspan=12|Round 6
|-

|-
!align=center colspan=12|Round 7
|-

|}

Pool B
Venue: Wuyuan County Sports Center Gymnasium

|-
!align=center colspan=12|Round 1
|-

|-
!align=center colspan=12|Round 2
|-

|-
!align=center colspan=12|Round 3
|-

|-
!align=center colspan=12|Round 4
|-

|-
!align=center colspan=12|Round 5
|-

|-
!align=center colspan=12|Round 6
|-

|-
!align=center colspan=12|Round 7
|-

|}

Pool C
Venue: Qinhuangdao Training Base Competition Hall

|-
!align=center colspan=12|Round 8
|-

|-
!align=center colspan=12|Round 9
|-

|-
!align=center colspan=12|Round 10
|-

|-
!align=center colspan=12|Round 11
|-

|}

Pool D
Venue: Wuyuan County Sports Center Gymnasium

|-
!align=center colspan=12|Round 8
|-

|-
!align=center colspan=12|Round 9
|-

|-
!align=center colspan=12|Round 10
|-

|-
!align=center colspan=12|Round 11
|-

|}

Pool E
Venue: Hafei Sports Center Gymnasium
|-
!colspan=12|Round 12
|-

|-
!colspan=12|Round 13
|-

|-
!colspan=12|Round 14
|-

|-
!colspan=12|Round 15
|-

|}

Pool F
Venue: Qinhuangdao Training Base Competition Hall

|-
!colspan=12|Round 12
|-

|-
!colspan=12|Round 13
|-

|-
!colspan=12|Round 14
|-

|}

Stage II

Standings

Pool G
Venue: Hebei Agricultural University West Campus Gymnasium

|-
!colspan=12|Round 16
|-

|-
!colspan=12|Round 17
|-

|-
!colspan=12|Round 18
|-

|}

Pool H
Venue: Hebei Agricultural University West Campus Gymnasium

|-
!colspan=12|Round 16
|-

|-
!colspan=12|Round 17
|-

|-
!colspan=12|Round 18
|-

|}

Pool K
Venue: Qinhuangdao Training Base Competition Hall

|-
!colspan=12|Round 15
|-

|-
!colspan=12|Round 16
|-

|-
!colspan=12|Round 17
|-

|-
!colspan=12|Round 18
|-

|-
!colspan=12|Round 19
|-

|}

Final stage
 All times are China Standard Time (UTC+8:00).
 All matches are best-of-three series.

Quarterfinals
Venue: Hebei Agricultural University West Campus Gymnasium
|-
!colspan=12|(G1) Zhejiang vs. (H4) Sichuan
|-

|-
!colspan=12|(H1) Beijing vs. (G4) Nanjing
|-

|-
!colspan=12|(H2) Tianjin vs. (G3) Shangha
|-

|-
!colspan=12|(G2) Baoding vs. (H3) |Shandong
|-

|}

5th–8th semifinals
|-
!colspan=12|Sichuan vs. Tianjin
|-

|-
!colspan=12|Nanjing vs. Baoding
|-

|}

Semifinals
|-
!colspan=12|Beijing vs. Shandong
|-

|-
!colspan=12|Zhejiang vs. Shanghai
|-

|}

7th place match
|-
!colspan=12|Sichuan vs. Nanjing
|-

|}

5th place match
|-
!colspan=12|Tianjin vs. Baoding
|-

|}

3rd place match
|-
!colspan=12|Zhejiang vs. Shandong
|-

|}

Final
|-
!colspan=12|Shanghai vs. Beijing
|-

|}

Final standings

Awards
Source:

 Most Valuable Player
  (Beijing)
 Best Setter
  (Beijing)
 Best Outside Spikers
  (Zhejiang)
  (Shandong)

 Best Middle Blockers
  (Shanghai)
  (Zhejiang)
 Best Opposite Spiker
  (Zhejiang)
 Best Libero
  (Shanghai)

 Best Foreign Player
  (Beijing)
 Most Popular Player
  (Zhejiang)

References

External links
 Official website
 Official competition page

Chinese Volleyball Super League, 2022-23
Chinese Volleyball Super League, 2022-23
Volleyball League, 2022-23
Volleyball League, 2022-23
League 2022-23